Seneca Township, Ohio may refer to:
Seneca Township, Monroe County, Ohio
Seneca Township, Noble County, Ohio
Seneca Township, Seneca County, Ohio

See also
Seneca Township (disambiguation)

Ohio township disambiguation pages